The Carnegie Library Building in Carroll, Iowa, United States, is a building from 1905. The  structure was designed in the Prairie School style by Omaha architect Thomas R. Kimball.  The Carnegie Corporation of New York had accepted Carroll's application for a grant for $10,000 on February 12, 1903.  It was listed on the National Register of Historic Places in 1976.

The library is now home to the Carroll County Historical Museum, which is operated by the Carroll Historical Society.

References

External links
 Carroll County Historical Society and Museum – City of Carroll, Iowa

Library buildings completed in 1905
Carroll, Iowa
Carnegie libraries in Iowa
Libraries on the National Register of Historic Places in Iowa
Prairie School architecture in Iowa
Buildings and structures in Carroll County, Iowa
Museums in Carroll County, Iowa
National Register of Historic Places in Carroll County, Iowa
1905 establishments in Iowa